Ivory Torrey Thigpen is an American politician. He is a member of the South Carolina House of Representatives from the 79th District, serving since 2016. He is a member of the Democratic party.

In 2023, Thigpen was elected Chair of the South Carolina Legislative Black Caucus.

South Carolina House of Representatives

Electoral history

References

Living people
1978 births
Democratic Party members of the South Carolina House of Representatives
21st-century American politicians
African-American people in South Carolina politics
Jackson State University alumni
21st-century African-American politicians
20th-century African-American people